Satanocrater (from σατανος‐, ‐κρατορας, meaning "devil's bowl") is a small genus of flowering plants in the family Acanthaceae, disjunctly distributed in Guinea in west Africa, and Ethiopia, Kenya, Somalia and Sudan in east Africa. They are xerophytes, and either shrubs or perennial herbs.

Species
Currently accepted species include:

Satanocrater fellatensis Schweinf.
Satanocrater paradoxa (Lindau) Lindau
Satanocrater ruspolii (Lindau) Lindau
Satanocrater somalensis (Lindau) Lindau

References

Acanthaceae
Acanthaceae genera